Aphyocypris is a genus of cyprinid fishes consisting of eight species, all of which are restricted to East Asia.

Species
There are currently ten recognized species in this genus:
 Aphyocypris amnis T. Y. Liao, S. O. Kullander & H. D. Lin, 2011
 Aphyocypris arcus (Lin, 1931)
 Aphyocypris chinensis Günther, 1868 (Chinese bleak)
 Aphyocypris dorsohorizontalis (V. H. Nguyễn & L. H. Doan), 1969
 Aphyocypris kikuchii (Ōshima, 1919)
 Aphyocypris kyphus (Mai, 1978)
 Aphyocypris lini (S. H. Weitzman & L. L. Chan, 1966) (Garnet minnow)
 Aphyocypris moltrechti (Regan, 1908) (Moltrecht's minnow)
 Aphyocypris normalis (Nichols & C. H. Pope, 1927)
 Aphyocypris pulchrilineata Y. Zhu, Y. H. Zhao & K. Huang, 2013

References

Cyprinidae genera
Taxa named by Albert Günther